Tenement Halls is the name used by artist Chris Lopez for his solo work.  Lopez was formerly the frontman and lead vocalist for indie rock band The Rock*A*Teens.  To date, Lopez has released one album under the Tenement Halls moniker, 2005's Knitting Needles and Bicycle Bells.  It is unclear whether Lopez is still creating music, or if he intends to use the Tenement Halls name in the future.

Tenement Halls is currently signed to Merge Records.

Discography

Albums
 Knitting Needles and Bicycle Bells (2005, Merge Records)

External links
 Tenement Halls

American indie rock groups